Scouting in Oklahoma has a long history, from the 1910s to the present day, serving thousands of youth in programs that suit the environment in which they live.

Early history (1909–1950)
The first Boy Scout troop in America is claimed to have been organized in Pawhuska, in May 1909 by John F. Mitchell. Pawhuska is in the Cherokee Area Council.

In 1917, the Guthrie Council was formed. It closed in 1918.

In 1921, the Miami Council was formed. It closed that same year.

The Hobart Council (#476) was founded in 1922. It closed in 1925.

The Durant Council was founded in 1921 and changed its name in 1923 to the Kiamichi Area Council (#736).

In 1930, the Kiamichi Area Council (#736) dissolved with parts going to T-O Council, Lamar County Council, Red River Area Council and the Pontotoc County Council.

In 1918, the Ardmore Council (#468) was founded. It merged into the Red River Area Council (#468) in 1925.

In 1922, the Garvin and McClain Area Council (#475) was founded. It merged into the Red River Area Council (#468) in 1925.

In 1925, the Red River Area Council (#468) was founded. It changed its name to  the Chickasaw Council (#468) in 1930.

In 1930, the Chickasaw Council (#468) was founded. It merged into the Arbuckle Area Council in 1946.

In 1920, the Pontotoc County Council (#484) was founded. It merged into the Arbuckle Area Council in 1946.

In 1917, the Bartlesville Council (#469) was founded. It changed its name to the Cherokee Area Council (#469) in 1925.

In 1922, the Pawhuska Council (#462) was founded. It changed its name to the Osage County Council in 1923.

In 1923, the Osage County Council (#482) was founded. It changed its name to the Osage and Pawnee Counties Area Council (#469) in 1925. In 1926, the council changes its name to the Pawhuska Council (#482), which merged with the Cherokee Area Council (#469) in 1928.

In 1927, the Northeastern Oklahoma Council (#566) was founded. It merged with the Cherokee Area Council (#469) in 1929.

The Cherokee Area Council (#469) was founded in 1925.

The Stillwater Council was founded in 1920. It merged into Cimarron Valley Council (#473) in 1922.

The Creek County Council was founded in 1922. It merged into Cimarron Valley Council (#473) in 1922.

The Cimarron Valley Area Council (#473) was founded in 1922. It merged in to the Will Rogers Council (#473) in 1948.

The Ponca City Council (#483) was founded in 1921, changing its name to the Noble-Kay Counties Council (#483) in 1926. Noble-Kay Counties changed its name to the Northern Oklahoma Council (#483) in 1929. Northern Oklahoma changed its name to the Ponca Area Council (#483) in 1931. Ponca Area changed its name to the Northern Oklahoma Council (#483) in 1936.  The Northern Oklahoma Council (#483) merged into the Will Rogers Council (#473) in 1948.

The Will Rogers Council (#473) was founded in 1948. It merged in to the Cimarron Council (#473) in 2000.

The Northwest Oklahoma Council (#570) was founded in 1927. It merged in to the Great Salt Plains Council (#474) in 1928.

The Great Salt Plains Council (#474) was founded in 1927. It merged in to the Cimarron Council (#473) in 2000.

The Enid Council was founded in 1921. It changed its name to the Garfield County Council (#474) in 1923.

The Shawnee Council (#485) was founded in 1919. It changed its name to the Pottawatomie Rogers Council (#485) in 1922. It changed its name to the Canadian Valley Council (#485) in 1927.

The Jackson County Council was founded in 1920. It changed its name to the Navajo Mountain Area Council (#476) in 1925.

The Chickasha Council (#471) was founded in 1918. It changed its name to the Grady County Area Council (#471) in 1926. The Grady County Council (#471) merged into the Black Beaver Council (#471) in 1930.

The Stephens County Council (#487) was founded in 1921. It changed its name to the Jefferson-Stephens Area Council (#487) in 1924. Jefferson-Stephens Area changed its name in 1930 to the Je-Ste-Co Council (#487). Je-Ste-Co merged into Black Beaver Council (#472) in 1932.

The Comanche County Council (#472) was founded in 1922. It changed its name to the Black Beaver Area Council (#472) in 1925. The Black Beaver Area Council (#472) merged into the Navajo Mountain Area Council (#476) in 1927.

In 1925, the Navajo Mountain Area Council (#476) was founded. It merged into the Black Beaver Council (#471) in 1930.

In 1917, the Oklahoma City Council (#480) was founded.

In 1920, the Norman Council (#479) was founded. It merged into the Oklahoma City Council (#480) in 1927.

In 1928, the Oklahoma City Council (#480) merged into the Oklahoma County Council (#480).

In 1927, the Ca-Bla-Ki Council (#475) was founded. It merged into the Oklahoma County Council (#480) in 1928.

In 1927, the Washita Valley Council (#470) was founded. It merged into the Oklahoma County Council (#480) in 1933.

In 1927, the Canadian Valley Council (#485) was founded. It merged into the Last Frontier Council (#480) in 1947.

In 1930, the Oklahoma County Council (#480) changed its name to Central Oklahoma Council (#480). It merged into the Last Frontier Council (#480) in 1939.

In 1939, the Last Frontier Council (#480) was founded.

In 1911, the Tulsa Council (#488) was founded. It changed its name to the Tulsa County Council (#488) in 1922 after adding the remainder of Tulsa County. It changed its name to the Tulsa Area Council (#488) in 1936 after adding Rogers and Mayes Counties. It changed its name to the Indian Nations Council (#488) in 1957 after merging with the Creek Nations Council.

In 1920, the Pittsburg County Council (#477) was founded. It changed its name to the McAlester Council (#477) in 1921.

In 1920, the Sapulpa Council (#486) was founded. It changed its name to the Creek County Council (#486) in 1925.

In 1920, the Drumright Council was founded. It merged into the Creek County Council (#486) in 1922.

In 1927, the Creek County Council (#486) was founded. It merged into Creek Nation Area Council (#481) in 1928.

The Creek Nation Council (#481) was founded in 1928. It merged with the Indian Nations Council (#488) in 1957.

In 1922, the South Creek County Council (#470) was founded. It changed its name to the Bristow Council (#488) in 1923. It merged into the Okmulgee Council (#481) in 1927.

In 1919, the Okmulgee Council (#481) was founded. It changed its name to the Okmulgee County Council (#481) in 1927.

In 1921, the McAlester Council (#477) was founded. It changed its name to the Choctaw Area Council (#486) in 1926.

In 1917, the Muskogee Council (#478) was founded. It changed its name to the Muskogee Area Council (#478) in 1927. It changed its name to the Eastern Oklahoma Area Council (#478) in 1949.

The Choctaw Area Council (#477) was founded in 1926. It merged with the Indian Nations Council (#488) in 1971.

In 1928, the Tex-Okla Council (#489) was founded and merged into the  Adobe Walls Council (#569) in 1931.

Recent history (1950–present)

The Eastern Oklahoma Area Council (#478) was founded in 1949. It merged with the Indian Nations Council (#488) in 1983.

The Indian Nations Council (#488) was founded in 1957.

The Cimarron Council (#473) was founded in 2000 from the merger of the Will Rogers Council (#473) and the Great Salt Plains Council (#474).

The Black Beaver Council, founded in 1930 merged into the Last Frontier Council (#480) in 1996.

Scouting in Oklahoma today

Boy Scouts of America
There are eight Boy Scouts of America (BSA) local councils based in, or providing services within, the state of Oklahoma.

Arbuckle Area Council

The Boy Scouts of America Arbuckle Area Council maintains offices in Ardmore, Oklahoma, and serves youth and their families in Pontotoc, Murray, Johnston, Garvin, Coal, Atoka, Carter, Love and Marshall counties in southern Oklahoma and the city of Ringling. The Arbuckle Area Council provides a web presence for its membership and other interested persons.

Districts
Chickasaw District covers Carter, Love, Marshall, Johnston counties and the city of Ringling
Harry Miller District covers Pontotoc, Atoka, and Coal counties.
Washita District covers Murray and Garvin counties.

Camps
Camp Simpson, southern Oklahoma's "slice of heaven." Home to Summer Camp and Winter Camp activities.  Also available for year-round reservations.  Motel room rentals, proms, weddings, family reunions, youth camps, church retreats, school outings.

Order of the Arrow
Wisawanik Lodge #190

Cherokee Area Council

The Boy Scouts of America Cherokee Area Council maintains an office in Bartlesville, Oklahoma, and serves youth and their families in northeastern Oklahoma. The Council provides a web presence for its membership and other interested persons.  Communities served by the council include Pawhuska, Bartlesville, Nowata, Vinita, Grove, Miami, and many others in six northeastern counties of Oklahoma.

Districts
Grand Lake District
Osage Hills District

Camps
Camp McClintock - Outside of Bartlesville, Oklahoma

Order of the Arrow
Washita Lodge #288

Cimarron Council

The Boy Scouts of America's Cimarron Council maintains an office in Enid and serves youth and their families in northwestern and north central Oklahoma. The Council provides a web presence for its membership and other interested persons.  The Cimarron Council was established in June 2000 following the mergers of the Great Salt Plains Council (Enid) and the Will Rogers Council (Ponca City).

Organization
The Cimarron Council is divided into two service areas. North and West includes Enid and Woodward.  South and East serves Ponca City and Stillwater.

Camps
Will Rogers Scout Reservation
The Will Rogers Scout Reservation, named for Will Rogers, one of Oklahoma's favorite sons, is the premier camping facility of the Cimarron Council. The camp consists of approximately  small hilly of oak and hickory forest with its northern boundary being bluffs.  The camp features a small centralized dining hall with regional shower facilities and program areas. There are archery, shotgun, and rifle ranges, a boat dock and pond, swimming pool, a central bath house, and several camping areas. It is located near Cleveland, Oklahoma.
Williams Scout Reservation
It is located near Cleo Springs and Fairview.
Sundance Scout Training Center
The Sundance Scout Training Center was sold in 2021.

Order of the Arrow

The Ema 'O Mahpe Lodge (#14) of the Order of the Arrow was founded on April 1, 2001, from the mergers of the Ah-Ska Lodge (#213) and Inola Lodge (#148). Ema 'O Mahpe is Cherokee for "Red Water", and the lodge totem is the coyote.

Circle Ten Council

The Circle Ten Council serves youth in North Central Texas and Bryan County, Oklahoma. Bryan County falls under the Texoma Valley District of the Council.

Golden Spread Council

The Golden Spread Council serves Scouts in Texas and the Oklahoma Panhandle counties of Cimarron, Texas, and western half of Beaver. The Oklahoma counties fall in the Lone Wolf District.

Indian Nations Council

The Indian Nations Council maintains offices in Tulsa and serves most of eastern Oklahoma. The Indian Nations Council provides a web presence for its membership and other interested persons

Districts
Bokchito District (no longer active, merged with Oka Tuli)
Creek Nation District (no longer active, now part of Sac & Fox district)
Eagle District
Neosho District
Indian Chiefs District (no longer active, disbanded into Sequoyah and Twin Arrows in 2004)
Oka Tuli District
Sac and Fox District (renamed Scissortail District)
Sequoyah District
Twin Arrows District

Camp Properties
Mabee Scout Reservation, Locust Grove
Jack Graves Scout Reservation, Broken Arrow
Hale Scout Reservation, Talihina
Zink Scout Ranch, Sand Springs
Cherokee Nation Scout Ranch, Welling

Order of the Arrow

The Ta Tsu Hwa Lodge (#138) was formed in 1938 under the name of "Yaqui". In 1957 Yaqui Lodge merged with the Checote Lodge (#154) due to the merger of the Tulsa Area Council and the Creek Nation Council, creating the Indian Nations Council. The new lodge was named the "Daw Zu" Lodge (#138). In 1959 the lodge was renamed "Ta Tsu Hwa," meaning "Red Bird". Between 1959 and the present day, the Lodge absorbed the "Oskihoma" Lodge (#320) and the "Ni-U-Kon-Ska" Lodge (#328) as the Indian Nations Council absorbed the Choctaw Area Council and the Eastern Oklahoma Council.

The distinctive "Red Bird" lodge flap of the Ta Tsu Hwa Lodge is shaped differently than the standard pocket flap.

Last Frontier Council

The Last Frontier Council operates six camps and is based in two service centers which are located in Lawton and Oklahoma City. Last Frontier Council supports its volunteer leaders, who deliver Scouting in twenty-four counties in central, western and southwestern Oklahoma.

Districts
The Baden-Powell District geographic territory covers Northwest Oklahoma City from Memorial Road on the north to Santa Fe Avenue on the east to County Line Road on the west, and along Reno Avenue on the south in Oklahoma County, Oklahoma.

The Big Tepee District geographic territory includes the Capitol Hill area of southwest Oklahoma City and portions of northeast Oklahoma City and the eastern Oklahoma County communities of Midwest City, Del City, Jones, Harrah, and Choctaw. Also included are Crooked Oaks School District and Tinker Air Force Base.   The district boundaries include, from I-40 and Santa Fe, traveling north on Santa Fe Avenue to 63rd Street, east to Anderson Road then north to Memorial Road (which includes Jones) then east to the county line. Traveling south from Memorial Road to 89th Street, then go west to County Line Road and then north on County Line Road to I-40. Travel east on I-40 from County Line Road to Santa Fe Avenue.

The Black Beaver District geographic territory covers the Oklahoma communities of Lawton, Cache, Medicine Park, and all other communities in Comanche County, and all Caddo County communities except for those communities which are in the northern tip of Caddo County. Named for the former Black Beaver Council, when it was absorbed into the Last Frontier Council, the troop numbers of the council were augmented by making them all of the 4000 series (i.e. Black Beaver Council 327 became Last Frontier Council 4327).

The Canadian Valley District geographic territory includes all communities in Pottawatomie County, Seminole County, and Hughes County, as well as the communities in the southern one-third of Lincoln County.

The Chisholm Trail District geographic territory includes all communities in Grady County, all communities in Stephens County, and all communities in Jefferson County.  Chisholm Trail District also includes the city of Lindsay in Garvin County.

The Eagle District geographic territory covers all of Logan County and the north tip of Oklahoma County including Edmond from Memorial Road north and west to Macarthur. Communities served through Eagle District include northwest Oklahoma City, Edmond, Guthrie, Crescent, Coyle, Luther, Langston and Mulhall/Orlando in Logan County and Oklahoma County.   The towns of Wellston in Lincoln County and Cashion in Kingfisher County are also a part of Eagle District.

The Kickingbird District geographic territory covers all of Harmon County, Greer County, Kiowa County, Jackson County, and Tillman County in Oklahoma.

The Sooner District geographic territory in Oklahoma covers Norman, Moore, Little Axe and all other communities in Cleveland County; Purcell, Blanchard, Wayne, Washington, Goldsby and all other communities in McClain County;

The Western Plains District geographic territory in western Oklahoma includes all of Roger Mills County, Custer County, Beckham County,  Washita County, and the northern tip of Caddo County.

The Wiley Post District split off from Baden Powell, covering the western side of the district boundaries.

The Will Rogers District geographic territory includes all communities in Canadian County and western Oklahoma County from Portland Avenue and to the west and from NW 39th Street and to the south.

Camps
 Diamond H Scout Ranch 
Located near Lake Tenkiller, the Diamond H Scout Ranch is located in eastern Oklahoma.   The camp property is currently undeveloped and restricted in use.  Only primitive, weekend camping is presently available. Advanced reservations are required to visit the property.
 Dripping Springs 
Camp Dripping Springs is an  property in western Oklahoma. The camp setting offers the opportunity for Scouts to practice tracking, track casting, star study, compass work, fishing, or tree identification.
 George Thomas 
Camp George Thomas is located at the foot of the Wichita Mountains in Caddo County off State Highway 19. The camp is used for general unit camping by packs, troops, teams, crews and ships, for training courses, numerous district and council events, Cub — Webelos Scout Resident Camp, and the council's Cub-Webelos Fall Family Adventure (family weekend camping) opportunities each fall.
 John Nichols Scout Ranch 
John Nichols Scout Ranch, John Nichols Scout Ranch maintained since 1932, is the oldest camp property within the council.  Located on the southwest edge of Oklahoma City at SW 119th and County Line Road, John Nichols Scout Ranch is available year-round to Scout groups for overnight campouts, weekend campouts, and various training opportunities.  Kickapoo serves as the host location for several day camp weeks each summer and for the Kickapoo Kampers Family Overnight Adventures each fall.  Verna
 Sasakwa 
Camp Sasakwa is situated near Holdenville, Oklahoma. The property is used for primitive, short-term camping only, offering a low-impact, high adventure setting.  Advance reservations are required and all supplies and water must be carried in and all refuse must be carried out.
 Kerr Scout Ranch at Slippery Falls 
Kerr Scout Ranch at Slippery Falls (KSR@SF) is located near Tishomingo, Oklahoma. 'Slip' is the largest and the most developed of the six camping properties in the council.  KSR@SF is the summer camp facility in the council for Boy Scouts and Venturers.

Order of the Arrow

MaNu Lodge No. 133 was originally chartered to the Central Oklahoma Area Council, Region 9 on August 20, 1938. One year later the Central Oklahoma Area Council rechartered as Last Frontier Council. This makes MaNu Lodge one year older than Last Frontier Council. Over the next few decades there would be several mergers and reorganizations within the structure of both the Lodge and the Council.

As the area of the lodge expanded, the lodge began to need another form of organization. In 1963, MaNu lodge set up Chapters with borders corresponding to the districts established by the Council. In 1950, Canadian Valley Council merged with Last Frontier Council and Shawnee Lodge 192 became part of MaNu Lodge 133. Again in 1996 Black Beaver Council merged with Last Frontier Council and two years later Sekettummaqua Lodge 281 completed its merger with MaNu bringing the number of members to near 1700 and the total number of Chapters to ten.

Today, the lodge has experienced a myriad of growth and development and continues to tweak its organizational structure to better meet the demands of today's program. There are currently seven Lodge Officers: The Lodge Chief; The Lodge Vice Chief of Program; The Lodge Vice Chief of Activities; The Lodge Vice Chief of Chapters;  The Lodge Vice Chief of Inductions, The Lodge Vice Chief of Finance,  The Lodge Vice Chief of Administration.  There are also numerous Associate Lodge Advisers.

Meaning of Name: White Buffalo (in the Osage Language)*
Location: Oklahoma City, Oklahoma
Lodge Totem: The White Buffalo
Founding Date: August 20, 1938
Current Membership: 1,176
Special Note: Although the literal translation of MaNu is White Buffalo, the Osage word for white also meant Spirit, so MaNu means Spirit Buffalo.

NeTSeO Trails Council

The NeTseO Trails Council serves Scouts in Texas and the Southeast Oklahoma counties of McCurtain, Choctaw, and the southern three quarters of Pushmataha.

Girl Scouting in Oklahoma

There are five Girl Scout councils in Oklahoma.

Girl Scouts - Diamonds of Arkansas, Oklahoma and Texas

In Oklahoma serves girls in Adair, LeFlore, and Sequoyah counties.

Girl Scouts Missouri Heartland

Serves girls in two northeastern Oklahoma counties.

Girl Scouts of Texas Oklahoma Plains

Serves girls in the Oklahoma panhandle.

Girl Scouts of Eastern Oklahoma

Girl Scouts of Eastern Oklahoma serves 15,000 girls and adult volunteers in thirty eastern Oklahoma counties. The first troop in Tulsa was in 1917 and the first council in 1923.  The earliest known sale of cookies by an individual Girl Scouts unit in the United States was by the Mistletoe Troop in Muskogee, Oklahoma in December 1917 at their local high school. The current council was formed on June 1, 2008 with the merger of Bluestem, Tiak, and Magic Empire councils.

Service centers
Bartlesville, OK
McAlester, OK
Muskogee, OK
Stillwater, OK
Ada, OK

Camps
Camp Tallchief is north of Sand Springs, OK and on the John Zink Scout Ranch
Camp Swannie is north of Sand Springs, OK and next to Camp Tallchief

Scout houses
Eaton Lodge is in Cushing, OK
The Troop House in Tulsa

Girl Scouts - Western Oklahoma

Girl Scouts-Western Oklahoma serves girls in 39 western Oklahoma counties.  It was formed by the merger of Red Lands and Sooner Councils in March 2008.

Camps
Camp E-Ko-Wah near Marlow, OK
Cookieland near Newalla, OK

Scouting museums in Oklahoma

Osage County Historical Museum

References

External links

Cimarron Council

Youth organizations based in Oklahoma
Oklahoma
Southern Region (Boy Scouts of America)